Quadient is an international company specialized in mailing equipment, business process automation and customer experience management. It was originally founded as Neopost. As of 2019, the company had about 5,693 employees and annual sales of €1.14 billion. Its products and services are sold in about 90 countries. Quadient is a company listed on the Euronext Paris market (Compartment B). Its stock ticker is QDT.

History
 1924 Founding of Neopost Limited (United Kingdom)
 1929 Founding of SMH, Société des Machines Havas (France) 
 1930 Acquisition of Neopost by Roneo (United Kingdom)
 1935 Creation of Neopost brand name (United Kingdom)
 1970 Acquisition by C.G.E. of SMH-Adrex (France)
 1979 Acquisition by C.G.E. of Friden (United States)
 1980 Acquisition by C.G.E. of Roneo and Hadewe (United Kingdom and Netherlands)
 1981 Attached to Alcatel, subsidiary of C.G.E. (France)
 1992 Foundation of Neopost Group
 1997 A group of investors, advised by BC Partners and in association with management, took control of Neopost
 1999 Neopost was floated on the Premier Marché of Euronext Paris on 23 February at a price of €15 per share
 2002 Acquisition of Stielow and Hasler (Germany and Switzerland)
 2003 Neopost completed the integration of companies acquired in 2002, sold Stielow’s non-core label printing and print finishing businesses, and strengthened its operating structures 
 2005 Acquisition of BTA Digital Works, a software company
 2006 Neopost adopted and modified the tagline "We value your mail" at the beginning of 2006.
 2007 Acquisition of PFE, a supplier of high volume folder-inserters and Valipost
 2008 Acquisition of RENA, addressing systems supplier and NBG-ID, integrator of RFID technology
 2009 Acquisition of Satori Software, a postal address quality management software company
 2009 Acquisition of Kontur Documents Systems (Suède) and Scani (Denmark)
 2011 Acquisition of GBC – Fordigraph, an Australian distributor of document finishing and mailing products
 2012 Acquisition of GMC Software Technology – a Swiss-based provider of customer communications management products
 2012 Acquisition of Human Inference, a Dutch provider of contact data quality services
 2013 Acquisition of DMTI Spatial – a Canadian provider of location-based service provider
 2014 Acquisition of Data Capture Solutions Ltd, a document management business
2016 Acquisition of icon Systemhaus
2019 The company was renamed Quadient 
In March 2020, Quadient sold ProShip, Inc. to FOG Software Group, a division of Constellation Software
2020 Acquisition of YayPay, an accounts receivable automation software company (United States)
2021 Acquisition of Beanworks, a Canadian accounts payable automation software company

Board 
Chief Executive Officer: Geoffrey Godet (since February 2018).

Structure 
Quadient employs around 6 000 people across 29 countries : Australia, Austria, Belgium, Brazil, Canada, China, Czech Republic, Denmark, Finland, France, Germany, Hungary, India, Ireland, Italy, Japan, Luxembourg, Mexico, Netherlands, Norway, Poland, Singapore, Spain, Sweden, Switzerland, the United Kingdom, the United States, Taiwan and Thailand. Aside from its branches, Quadient also has a network of 90 independent distributors. 

Quadient's headquarters are located in Bagneux.

See also
 Neopost web-enabled stamps
 Postage meters
 Franking

References

Office supply companies of France
Postal systems
Manufacturing companies established in 1924
Multinational companies headquartered in France
Companies based in Bagneux
Data companies
Data quality companies
French brands
Information technology companies of France
Companies listed on Euronext Paris
1924 establishments in the United Kingdom